Koul Panha is an executive director of a non-governmental organization COMFREL (The Committee for Free and Fair Elections in Cambodia) in Cambodia. COMFREL was established in 1997 with an aim to facilitate free, fair and meaningful elections in Cambodia.
Koul took charge as Executive Director of COMFREL in 1998.

Early life

Panha was eight years old when his father and relatives were killed due to the Khmer Rouge regime in Cambodia. He started teaching in capital city of Cambodia, Phnom Penh after having attained his university degree. By the early 1990s, he got involved in the human rights movement in Cambodia and also worked for Free and Fair elections. After joining COMFREL, Koul completed his master's degree in Politics of Alternative Development.

Ramon Magsaysay Award

In 2011, Koul Panha was awarded the Ramon Magsaysay Award for his work for Electoral reforms in Cambodia.

See also
Ramon Magsaysay Award
Oung Chanthol
List of Ramon Magsaysay Award winners

References 

Cambodian human rights activists
Living people
Year of birth missing (living people)